The 2011–12 Liga III season was the 56th season of the Liga III, the third tier of the Romanian football league system. Day one was played on August 19, 2011 and the last round on June 1, 2012.

League tables

Seria I

Seria II

Seria III

Seria IV

Seria V

Seria VI

See also

 2011–12 Liga I
 2011–12 Liga II
 2011–12 Liga IV

2011
3
Rom